Rabia Chaudry (Urdu: رابعہ چودھری) is a Pakistani-American attorney, author and podcast host. Family friend of Adnan Syed, subject of the podcast Serial (2014), Chaudry subsequently wrote a book about his case called Adnan’s Story: The Search for Truth and Justice After Serial (2016), which became a New York Times best seller. Chaudry co-hosts Undisclosed, a podcast on Syed's case and others.

Early life 
Chaudry was born in Pakistan. She attended the University of Maryland, Baltimore County and the George Mason University School of Law.

Career 
Chaudry, a childhood friend of Adnan Syed, was the first person to take his case to radio producer and host Sarah Koenig; on the 2014 podcast Serial, Koenig documented her investigation into Chaudry’s contention that Syed had been wrongly convicted of killing Hae Min Lee. Chaudry subsequently wrote a book about the case called Adnan’s Story: The Search for Truth and Justice After Serial (St. Martin Press, September 2016). Molly Fitzgerald writes in Bustle that the book "picks up where ‘Serial’ left off," describing evidence not included in the Serial podcast including letters he wrote to his family early in his imprisonment. Reviewing the book for the Los Angeles Times, Jessica Roy wrote, “It was easy to forget, listening to ‘Serial,’ that it was a true story about real people. ‘Adnan’s Story’ adds context and humanizes it in a way that could change how you think about the case, and about ‘Serial’ itself.” Adnan's Story became a New York Times best-seller and one of Audible's 10 most popular audio books of 2016.

Chaudry also has a podcast, Undisclosed with Susan Simpson and Colin Miller, that looks at evidence in Syed's case, the case of Joey Watkins, and others.

Chaudry has been a fellow at the US Institute of Peace and at the New America Foundation. She is founder and president of the Safe Nation Collaborative, a project that offers education on Islamic faith, dialogue between law enforcement and Muslim communities, and countering violent extremism.

References

Works

External links
  
 Undisclosed podcast
 

American lawyers
American Muslims
American non-fiction writers
American writers of Pakistani descent
Year of birth missing (living people)
American Book Award winners
Pakistani emigrants to the United States
American women non-fiction writers
George Mason University alumni
University of Maryland, Baltimore County alumni